The Hemet Public Library is a public library in Hemet, California, United States which opened its current new building in July 2003.

History
The library can trace its history back to 1906 when members of the Hemet Woman's Club wanted a place to gather and read literature, so they opened a reading room on the second floor of a bank on the Bothin Block.

After the city's incorporation in 1910, citizens voted for their own library, and the new city took over the operation of its library facility. Soon, the upstairs reading room opened by the Woman's Club quickly outgrew itself. Woman's Club members—along with many other community organizations—campaigned to get a public building built to house a permanent library collection. The late Mrs. E. A. Davis then composed a letter to Andrew Carnegie asking for the funds to help the community build a new facility. Mr. Carnegie responded by sending a check for $7,500. However, Carnegie placed a contingency on his donation:  the City of Hemet had to contribute the remainder of the $12,000 necessary to complete the construction. The City of Hemet agreed to contribute the funds soon after. The land used for the first library facility was donated by Mr. and Mrs. James St. John and the library was built there on the corner of Buena Vista Street and Florida Avenue. Construction of the "Carnegie Library" was completed in early 1913.

The Carnegie Library remained open and operated by the City for 52 years. The Carnegie Library was eventually razed in 1969 having stood in the community for 56 years. This made room for the C. B. Covell Memorial Library Building which began construction in March 1971. Named after Clarence B. Covell, a Library Board member from 1910-1920, the Covell Memorial Library Building was designed by Hemet architect James Calkins.

By the start of the new millennium, the library facilities became too small to accommodate the increasing number of visitors from the growing city, and an expansion of the library was initiated. After months of construction, the City of Hemet opened its current facility on June 21, 2003.

References

External links
 City of Hemet Public Library Home Page
 Hemet Local History at the Library
 City of Hemet Home Page 

Public libraries in California
Carnegie libraries in California
1910 establishments in California
Hemet, California
Libraries in Riverside County, California
Library buildings completed in 2003